Antaheen (sometimes dubbed in English as The Endless Wait) is a 2009 Bengali film directed by Aniruddha Roy Chowdhury. The film stars Radhika Apte, Rahul Bose, Mita Vashisth, Aparna Sen, Kalyan Ray and Sharmila Tagore.

Plot

Abhik Chowdhury is an honest, upright, yet caring IPS Officer. After witnessing the tragedies of life, he loses faith in the real relationships that he sees around him, and seeks solace in the virtual world. Through this, Abhik develops an online friendship with a young woman, without knowing any real information about her. The woman is Brinda - a young, dynamic television journalist who comes from a conventional middle-class family. While the relationship blossoms within the confines of two computer screens, Abhik gets his fifteen minutes of fame on national television, when he successfully masterminds a raid on a consignment of illegal arms. Brinda telephones him to ask for an on-camera interview, but Abhik declines, stating that he does not want to sensationalize the event any further. The virtual friends have a frosty first meeting in the real world, at the launch of a controversial mega project of a big-time real estate entrepreneur, Vijay Ketan Mehra. Unaware that she knows Abhik so well on the internet, Brinda, still smarting from Abhik's refusal to be interviewed, gets into a bitter exchange of words with him, which escalates into a heated argument. Before leaving in a huff, Brinda overhears a piece of conversation between two men about Mehra's project. This gives her a lead to a potentially big scoop.

Ranjan and Paromita (Paro), an estranged couple, become the bridge between Brinda and Abhik. Ranjan is Abhik's cousin, who also acts as his philosopher and guide. Ranjan is a high-stakes stock market addict, and leads a lonely life after having separated from Paro a few years ago. Ranjan is acutely sensitive and perceptive, while also being bitter and cynical on the surface. Paro is a senior marketing executive at the channel for which Brinda works. Paro secretly organises a birthday party for Ranjan, and Brinda and Abhik meet once again. Their initial irritation wears off and they soon become friends. The mood of the party turns romantic yet poignant, as Paro and Ranjan attempt to reconcile. Online, Brinda and Abhik's virtual friendship continues unabated, even though their identities remain undisclosed and they are both unaware that they have met.

Abhik confides in Ranjan that he is probably falling in love, although he does not know with whom. Ranjan warns Abhik with his usual cynicism and reminds him of the perils and pains that often comes with love. Behind his sardonic comments, Abhik gets a glimpse of Ranjan's sensitivity and loneliness. After hearing his cousin's advice, Abhik leaves feeling confused, yet is still not convinced enough to stop falling further in love. Paro gets a lucrative job offer from Mumbai, but she is in two minds between upgrading her career and staying back for lost love. As the crisis deepens in her mind, she seeks Ranjan's advice. Although it is bound to intensify his loneliness, Ranjan encourages her to shift to Mumbai. Paro is hurt by Ranjan's pragmatic, well-meaning advice, since she hoped that he would want her to stay back in the city. A series of upsetting events and the stresses of her personal life begins to weigh Brinda down. The only thing she can find solace is with her virtual friend, who seems to be her only source of comfort. At work, Brinda hits a stumbling block while doing an investigative story on Mehra's project, and she turns to Abhik for help. Brinda begins to notice some uncanny similarities between Abhik and her anonymous online friend, in the way they talk, and in their choice of phrase, etc. As she follows the leads given by Abhik, she manages to get an important interview lined up which may give her the proof she needs to wrap up her story. She decides to message her virtual friend, finally suggesting that they meet in real life. Abhik experiences a wide range of emotions but is ultimately nervous and eager. The night before her interview, a particular phone conversation with Abhik strikes her, and she realises that he is in fact her online friend. That night, Brinda meets in a car accident on her way to work and dies before the meeting can happen. Abhik is saddened to hear of Brinda's death and also suspicious when he notices that his online friend has stopped replying. At Brinda's funeral, he finally realises what has happened and goes into mourning.

Cast
 Radhika Apte as Brinda
 Rahul Bose as Abhik Chowdhury
 Biswajit Chakraborty as Mr. Saha
 Barun Chanda as Dibakar
 Kaushik Ganguly as Mrinmoy
 Rudranil Ghosh as Tanmoy
 Shauvik Kundagrami as Mr. Mehra
 Kunal Padhy as Mr. Mukherjee
 Kalyan Ray as Ranjan
 Saswati Guhathakurta as Brinda's Mother
 Aparna Sen as Paro
 Arindam Sil as Sabya
 Sharmila Tagore as Abhik's aunt
 Mita Vasisht as Mrs. Mehra
 Sanjay Bhattacharya as Dr. Sanjay Bhattacharya
 Sugata Ghosh as Sugata Ghosh
 Ekavali Khanna as Ekkavali Khanna
 Jai Ranjan Ram as Dr. Jai Ranjan Ram
 Sabyasachi Sen as Dr. Sabyasachi Sen

Other Casts

 Anushree Acharya
 Sukanya Bhattacharya
 Jayshree Dasgupta
 Rajkumar Dutta
 Diya Guha
 Aparajita Majumdar
 Sudip Majumdar
 Pradip Rai
 Subhash Sarkar

Production
The film was shot on a limited budget on location in Kolkata. Rahul Bose and Sharmila Tagore worked on the film for free and composer Shantanu Moitra waived his fee for composing the film's music.

Awards
 56th National Film Awards
 Best Feature Film
 Best Cinematography - Abhik Mukhopadhyay
 Best Lyrics - Anindya Chatterjee & Chandril Bhattacharya for "Pherari Mon..."
 Best Female Playback Singer - Shreya Ghoshal for "Pherari Mon..."

Soundtracks
The lyrics were penned by Anindya Chatterjee and Chandril Bhattacharya. Shantanu Moitra is the music composer, while Shaan, Babul Supriyo, Shreya Ghosal, Srikanta Acharya, Antara Chowdhury and Pranab Biswas have lent their voices for this musical extravaganza.

See also
 Bengali films of 2009

References

External links
 

2009 films
Bengali-language Indian films
Films set in Kolkata
Best Feature Film National Film Award winners
Films whose cinematographer won the Best Cinematography National Film Award
Films shot in Kolkata
2000s Bengali-language films
Films directed by Aniruddha Roy Chowdhury